Israna is a village panchayat and tehsil in Panipat district in Haryana, India. It lies in the panipat Division.

History
During Third Battle of Panipat at Kala Amb on 14 January 14, 1761 between Maratha warrior Sadashivrao Bhau and Afghan invader Ahmad Shah Abdali, Bhau camped at empty space near Israna and his army camped at Bhadar and Bhaupur village is named after Sadashivrao Bhau. Maratha's built Pragateshwar Mahadev Temple at Bhadar and another Devi temple in the Panipat city. Some of the Ror community claims to have descended from the Marathas of this war. In 2018, Ashutosh Gowariker announced a movie for Third Battle of Panipat is the movie Panipat (film) where Arjun Kapoor and Sanjay Dutt will play Bhau and Abdali respectively.

Demographics

Schools&Computer centre
Schools in Israna:
Govt. Sr. Sec. School
Govt. Girls Middle School
Govt. Girls Senior Secondary School
Govt. Girls Sr. Sec. School
Govt. HKCL Computer Centre Israna

College

 Nemi Chand Medical college and Hospital, Israna, Panipat
Govt. College, Israna

Notable people
 Shubham Jaglan, professional golfer

Transportation
Train
Bus

References

Villages in Panipat district